Christopher George Myarick (born October 6, 1995) is an American football tight end for the New York Giants of the National Football League (NFL). He played college football at Temple.

Professional career

Miami Dolphins
Myarick was signed by the Miami Dolphins as an undrafted free agent on May 9, 2019. He was waived during final roster cuts on September 1, 2019, but was signed to the team's practice squad two days later, where he spent the rest of the season.

Myarick signed a reserve/futures contract with the Dolphins following the 2019 season on December 31, 2019. He was waived during final roster cuts again on September 5, 2020, and was again re-signed to the Dolphins' practice squad two days later. He was elevated to the active roster on November 13, November 21, December 12, and December 19 for the team's weeks 10, 11, 14, and 15 games against the Los Angeles Chargers, Denver Broncos, Kansas City Chiefs, and New England Patriots, and reverted to the practice squad after each game. He signed a reserve/future contract with the Dolphins on January 5, 2021.

On August 31, 2021, Myarick was waived by the Dolphins.

New York Giants
On September 2, 2021, Myarick was signed to the New York Giants practice squad. On November 22, 2021, Myarick was elevated from the practice squad for the game against the Tampa Bay Buccaneers. In that game, Myarick was targeted with a pass for the first time in his NFL career, but the throw was intercepted by Tampa Bay defender Steve McLendon. On November 24, 2021, Myarick was signed to the active roster. In a Week 12 game against the Philadelphia Eagles, Myarick made his first career reception on a one-yard touchdown pass from quarterback Daniel Jones. He later caught another pass for his second career catch, and finished the game with 11 receiving yards. Myarick received the highest grade from Pro Football Focus for the game of any Giants offensive player, and each of his catches was an important play in the Giants' 13–7 victory over Myarick's hometown team. On January 4, 2022, Myarick was waived.

Cincinnati Bengals
On January 6, 2022, Myarick was signed to the Cincinnati Bengals practice squad. He remained in that role through Super Bowl LVI.

New York Giants (second stint)
The Giants signed Myarick to a reserve/futures contract on February 22, 2022. In their season opener against the Tennessee Titans, he caught a late touchdown pass which, after a successful two-point conversion, gave the Giants a 21–20 lead that they would not relinquish. He was waived on December 28, re-signed to the practice squad two days later, and elevated to the active roster in advance of the Giants' next game. He signed a reserve/future contract on January 23, 2023.

References

External links
Miami Dolphins bio
Temple Owls football bio

1995 births
Living people
Sportspeople from Montgomery County, Pennsylvania
Players of American football from Pennsylvania
American football tight ends
Temple Owls football players
Miami Dolphins players
New York Giants players
Cincinnati Bengals players